Lakenmacher is a surname. Notable people with the surname include:

, German politician
Fynn Lakenmacher (born 2000), German footballer
Sven Lakenmacher (born 1971), German handball player
Wolfgang Lakenmacher (born 1943), German handball player